Statistics of Swiss Super League in the 1931–32 season.

Overview
It was contested by 18 teams, and Lausanne Sports won the championship.

Group 1

Table

Results

Group 2

Table

Results

Playoff

Table

Results 

|colspan="3" style="background-color:#D0D0D0" align=center|29 May 1932

|-
|colspan="3" style="background-color:#D0D0D0" align=center|5 June 1932

|-
|colspan="3" style="background-color:#D0D0D0" align=center|12 June 1932

|-
|colspan="3" style="background-color:#D0D0D0" align=center|26 June 1932

|}

Championship play-off 

|colspan="3" style="background-color:#D0D0D0" align=center|3 July 1932

|}

Sources 
 Switzerland 1931-32 at RSSSF

Nationalliga seasons
Swiss
1931–32 in Swiss football